Vilhelm Mathias Skeel (1746–1817) was a Danish landowner, county official, and military officer.

He grew up in Denmark and attended the Sorø Academy and received his Cand.jur. degree in 1765. He served as the County Governor of Stavanger county from 1772 until 1781. From 17 August 1785 to 31 December 1798 he was the county governor of Antvorskov and Korsør counties in Denmark. He also served as the county governor of Sorø and Ringsted counties from 1787 until 1798.

References

1746 births
1817 deaths
County governors of Norway